The River of Stars is a 1913 novel by the British writer Edgar Wallace. It was part of a series of stories in which the character of Commissioner Sanders appears, set in British West Africa.

Adataption
In 1921 it was turned into a silent British film of the same title directed by Floyd Martin Thornton and starring Teddy Arundell. It was produced by Stoll Pictures, Britain's leading film company at the time.

References

Bibliography
 Goble, Alan. The Complete Index to Literary Sources in Film. Walter de Gruyter, 1999.

1913 British novels
Novels by Edgar Wallace
Films set in Africa
British novels adapted into films